Blueprint is a Nigerian daily newspaper based  in Abuja. The newspaper started as a weekly publication in May 2011, then switched to a daily paper in September 2011. The paper has two editions - the print edition published daily and the online edition which updates as events unfold

External links

References 

Newspapers published in Abuja
Publications established in 2011
2011 establishments in Nigeria
Daily newspapers published in Nigeria